The Society of European Affairs Professionals (SEAP) is a federation of lobbies created in 1997.

Board 
 Malte Lohan : President

Committees 
 Philip Sheppard : Policy and Codes committee 
 Dani Kolb : Programme committee

References

External links 
 Official website

Organizations related to the European Union